Steve Jasso (born October 22, 2000) is an American soccer player who plays as a defender.

Career 
On February 14, 2019, Jasso signed for USL Championship side Real Monarchs, after previously playing with the Real Salt Lake academy. His option was declined by Real Monarchs following the 2020 season.

References

External links 
 Real Salt Lake 

2000 births
Living people
American soccer players
Association football defenders
Real Monarchs players
Soccer players from Tucson, Arizona
USL Championship players